Macrosiphoniella millefolii is a species of aphid in the family Aphididae.

Subspecies
These two subspecies belong to the species Macrosiphoniella millefolii:
 Macrosiphoniella millefolii millefolii (De Geer, 1773) c g
 Macrosiphoniella millefolii orientalis Pashtshenko, 1998 c g
Data sources: i = ITIS, c = Catalogue of Life, g = GBIF, b = Bugguide.net

References

Further reading

External links

 

Insects described in 1773
Macrosiphini
Taxa named by Charles De Geer